Felix Okechukwu Emordi is a Nigerian former football player who played for Enugu Rangers International. After his retirement from active football, he went into coaching and went on to guide Enyimba International F.C. to win the 2004 CAF Champions League.

Accolades

International
CAF Champions League – 2004

Individual
2005 African Coach of the Year
2nd Nigeria Pitch Awards – Coach of the Year

References

Nigerian footballers
Nigerian football managers
Rangers International F.C. players
Living people
People from Anambra State
Enyimba F.C. managers
Year of birth missing (living people)
Association footballers not categorized by position